D.C. Heath and Company was an American publishing company located at 125 Spring Street in Lexington, Massachusetts, specializing in textbooks.

History
The company was founded in Boston by Edwin Ginn and Daniel Collamore Heath in 1885. D.C. Heath and Company was owned by Raytheon from 1966 to 1995. When Raytheon exited the textbook market, it sold the company to Houghton Mifflin.

D.C. Heath started a small division of software editors to supplement the textbooks in the early 80's. The editors strove to make the software packages independent of the books. There were test banks that allowed teachers to pick and choose questions for their quizzes and tests. Development was further supported to enable teachers to create their own questions including a formula editor, tagging items by objectives, and including custom graphics in the question as well as in the answer key. This was for the Apple 2 then later Windows and Macintoshes. Many titles were commissioned for the areas of science, math, reading, social studies, and modern languages. These were interactive original programs. D.C. Heath gave this group their own identity, Collamore Educational Publishing. The editors were involved in all facets of the publishing process including contracts, development, design, publishing, marketing, and sales. Schools were just transitioning from the one computer classroom to the computer lab. In 1988 most of the software was being supported by William K. Bradford Publishing Company composed initially by D. C. Heath / Collamore personnel.

Publications-(note: There are far more titles than are listed here) 
Heath Elementary Science, by Herman and Nina Schneider, 6 volumes (1955)
Heath middle level literature (1996?) 
Heath Physics (1992) 
Fundamentals of Personal Rapid Transit (1978)
Discovering French Bleu: Complete Lesson Plans  
The Enduring Vision: A History of the American People Third Edition (1996)
Ruy Blas by Victor Hugo (1933)
The Renaissance Medieval or Modern?
The Enduring South: Subcultural Persistence in Mass Society (1972), by John Shelton Reed.
The Story of Georgia, Massey and Wood, 1904
MC68000: Assembly Language and Systems Programming (1988) 
Victor Hugo's Les Misérables: French Edition
Elizabeth Rice Allgeier, Albert Richard Allgeier, Sexual Interactions, 1991 
A Short German Grammar for High Schools and Colleges.(The book cover just says "German Grammar" for the title) by E.S.Sheldon, tutor in German in Harvard University (1903), copyright 1879
The Causes of the American Revolution (1950, 1962, 1973)
Builders of the Old World, Written by Gertrude Hartman and Illustrated by Marjorie Quennell (1951)
Composition and Rhetoric by William Williams copyright 1890 published 1893
The Nazi Revolution: Germany's Guilt or Germany's Fate?
Children and Their Helpers New American Readers For Catholic Schools by School Sisters of Notre Dame. (1938)
Donald Duck Sees South America (1945) H. Marion Palmer, Walt Disney
Old Time Stories of the Old North State by L.A.McCorkle (1903)
Old Testament Narratives selected and edited by Roy L. French and Mary Dawson (1931)
Hamlet The Arden Shakespeare, edited by E. K. Chambers, B.A (1908)
Discussions of Literature series, general editor Joseph H. Summers
Eugenie Grandet: French Edition, by Honore de Balzac, Abridged and Edited with Introduction Notes and Vocabulary by A.G.H. Spiers, PH.D., (copyright 1914)
"The Bug In The Hut" and "Nat The Rat", unknown authors, (1968 - 1970)
Modern European History - Revised Edition - by Hutton Webster Ph.D. (Copyright 1920 and 1925)
World Civilization (1940, 1944, 1949) by Hutton Webster and Edgar Bruce Wesley 
Hints Toward A Select and Descriptive Bibliography of Education - by G Stanley Hall and John M Mansfield (Copyright 13 August 1886)
Heath's Modern Language Series. Gerstacker's Germelshausen. 1894.

Elementary Linear Algebra: Second Edition by Roland E. Larson and Bruce H. Edwards (1991) 
Software initial addition by Hal Wexler, software editor, 1984-1988 then transitioned to William K. Bradford Publishing Company.
Campaign Organization by Xandra Kayden (1978)

References

Defunct book publishing companies of the United States
Companies based in Lexington, Massachusetts
Publishing companies established in 1885
Economic history of Boston
Educational software